USS Texan (ID-1354) was a United States Navy cargo ship and troop transport in commission from 1918 to 1919.

Texan was built in 1902 at Camden, New Jersey, by the New York Shipbuilding Corporation as the passenger ship SS Texan for the American-Hawaiian Steamship Company. The United States Shipping Board acquired her on 18 March 1918 for World War I service and transferred her to the U.S. Navy at New York City the same day. Assigned the Naval Registry Identification Number (ID. No.) 1354, she was commissioned as USS Texan on 23 March 1918.

Assigned to the Naval Overseas Transportation Service after being refitted for naval service, Texan loaded general military supplies and departed on 9 April 1918 in a convoy for France. Texan arrived at Brest, France, on 24 April 1918 and, after discharging her cargo, began the return voyage to New York on 19 May 1918. Upon her arrival there, she underwent voyage repairs and then loaded supplies, including 405 tons of ammunition and 10 locomotives destined for Marseilles, France. Texan departed with a convoy on 18 June 1918 and arrived at Marseilles on 7 July 1918. Texan made another round-trip voyage to Marseilles in September 1918. On 23 October 1918 she sank the American sail Barge   in a collision in the North River. She made another round trip to Le Verdon-sur-Mer, France, in November and December 1918 before returning to New York on 4 January 1919.

On 18 January 1919, Texan was transferred to the Cruiser and Transport Force and began operating as a troop transport, bringing troops of the American Expeditionary Force home to the United States from France until 7 August 1919, when she was reassigned to the 5th Naval District.

Texan was decommissioned on 22 August 1919 and returned to the United States Shipping Board for return to the American Hawaiian Steamship Company.

Texan returned to commercial service as SS Texan. During World War II she was on a commercial voyage when German submarine U-126 torpedoed, shelled and sank her off Cape San Antonio, Cuba, on 11 March 1942. Nine men were lost, and 38 survived.

References

Department of the Navy: Naval Historical Center Online Library of Selected Images:  U.S. Navy Ships: USS Texan (ID # 1354), 1918-1919
NavSource Online: Section Patrol Craft Photo Archive: Texan (ID 1354)

World War I cargo ships of the United States
Ships built by New York Shipbuilding Corporation
World War II shipwrecks in the Caribbean Sea
Ships sunk by German submarines in World War II
1902 ships
Cargo ships of the United States Navy
Unique transports of the United States Navy
Maritime incidents in March 1942